West Tribe FC, sometimes known as West Tribes FC, is a semi-professional association football club based in Kimbe, West New Britain, Papua New Guinea. The club was founded in 2018.

The club took part in the 2019 edition of the Papua New Guinea National Soccer League. The club finished second in the Islands Conference and qualified for the next stage, eventually reaching the quarter-finals.

History 
Reports of a club having entered the 2019 Papua New Guinea National Soccer League from the Kimbe region, under the name of West Tribe, first appeared in late 2018. The club were drawn into the Islands Conference. Before the season started, the club played a trial match against conference rivals Greengold Liners, winning 2–1. The two sides played again on the opening day, but neither side was able to find a goal in a nil-nil draw. However, the side went on to win three matches on the bounce to go top of the league at the halfway stage.

Consecutive 3–2 defeats to playoff rivals Chebu AROB FC and Radazz FC put their qualification for the next stage in doubt, but the side required only a win on the final day against bottom-of-the-table Vudal Gazelle FC to secure a place in the next stage. They were able to win the game 5–1, qualifying in second place behind Chebu AROB.

The club were drawn away against eight-time champions Hekari United in the quarter-finals, and despite a 'stand out' performance from Tribe's goalkeeper Alken Karapa limiting Hekari to just two goals, Tribe were unable to respond, going down 2–0 in their final match of the season.

Domestic Record

National Competitions 

 Papua New Guinea National Soccer League
 2019: Quarter-Finals

References 

Football clubs in Papua New Guinea
Association football clubs established in 2018
2018 establishments in Papua New Guinea